Spineni is a commune in Olt County, Muntenia, Romania. It is composed of seven villages: Alunișu, Cuza Vodă, Davidești, Optășani, Profa, Spineni and Vineți.

Natives
 Ion Iovescu

References

Communes in Olt County
Localities in Muntenia